, son of Duke Nobusuke, was a Japanese researcher of trains. He was a descendant of Tokugawa Yoshinao and consequently was born into an aristocratic family, but, like all Japanese aristocrats, lost his title with the post-war legal reforms of 1947.  He worked at TEI Park, a railroad museum in Tokyo. He married the third daughter of Emperor Hirohito, Princess Kazuko; they adopted a son from Ogyū-Matsudaira, Naotake. 

In 1966, Takatsukasa was found dead from carbon monoxide poisoning in the apartment of his mistress, a Ginza hostess.

Ancestry

References

1923 births
1966 deaths
Fujiwara clan
Takatsukasa family